Maria de las Mercedes Santa Cruz y Montalvo, (1789 Havana - 1852 Paris) was a Cuban author.

When fourteen years old she sailed with her parents for Spain, and finished her education in Madrid. In 1810, Santa Cruz y Montalvo married the French general, Antoine Christophe Merlin, and, in 1813 when the French troops left Spain, she went to Paris. There she soon became well known in French society and her home was the resort of persons eminent in science, literature, and art. In 1840 Santa Cruz y Montalvo made a visit to her native city, but in 1842 she returned again to her adopted country, where she had already obtained a reputation by her literary labors.

Her most important works are "Mis doce primeros anos" (Paris, 1833); "Memoires d'une Creole" (1835); "Ocios de una mujer de gran mundo" (1837); "L'esclavage aux colonies Espagnoles" (1840); "La Havane" (3 vols., 1842); "Les lionnes de Paris" (1845); and "Le due d'Athenes" (1848). Many of her works have been translated into several European languages; some of them were written originally in Spanish, though the majority were in French.

References

Sources

External link

1789 births
1852 deaths
Cuban women writers
19th-century women writers